Four Lions (originally titled We Are Four Lions) is a 2010 British political satire black comedy film directed by Chris Morris (in his directorial debut) and written by Morris, Sam Bain and Jesse Armstrong. The film, a jihad satire following a group of homegrown terrorist jihadis from Sheffield, South Yorkshire, England, stars Riz Ahmed, Kayvan Novak, Nigel Lindsay, Arsher Ali and Adeel Akhtar.

Plot
A group of four radicalised British Muslim men living in Sheffield, three of whom are British Pakistani, aspire to become suicide bombers. They are Omar (Riz Ahmed), who is deeply critical of Western society and interventionism; his
dim-witted and anxious cousin Waj (Kayvan Novak); Barry (Nigel Lindsay), a bad-tempered and extremely rash English convert to Islam; and the naive Faisal (Adeel Akhtar), who tries to train crows to be used as bombers. While Omar and Waj travel to an al Qaeda-affiliated training camp in Pakistan, Barry recruits a fifth member, Hassan (Arsher Ali), after witnessing him pretending to commit a suicide bombing at a conference. The training in Pakistan ends in disaster when Omar attempts to shoot down an US Army drone and accidentally destroys part of the training camp; the pair are forced to flee. However, Omar uses the experience to assert authority on his return to Britain.

The group disagrees about what the target should be. Barry wants to bomb a local mosque as a false flag operation to "radicalise the moderates". At the same time, Faisal suggests blowing up a Boots pharmacy because it sells contraceptives and tampons. Omar's conservative but pacifist brother visits him and tries to talk him out of doing anything violent; however, Omar and his wife mock him for keeping his wife in a small room and squirt him with water pistols, making him flee.

After the group begins production of the explosives, Hassan is left alone to watch the safe house as Barry takes Waj and Faisal out to a field for a test detonation of a small amount of TATP contained in Omar's microwave, using a nearby fireworks show to cover the sound. When they return, they find Hassan dancing with an oblivious neighbour (Julia Davis). The group suspects they have been compromised and transport their volatile explosives to a new location in grocery bags. Faisal trips up while crossing a field and is killed in the explosion. This angers Omar, who berates the others and leaves. Faisal's head is found, tipping off the authorities, and Omar visits the others to tell them. They reconcile, and Omar decides to target the upcoming London Marathon due to having access to mascot costumes, which they use to conceal the bombs. Meanwhile, armed police raid Omar's brother's house.

The group drives to London in their costumes to prepare for the attack. Waj expresses doubts about the morality of their plot, but Omar convinces him to go through with it. A police officer approaches the group but is satisfied and leaves after a brief conversation. Hassan loses his nerve and tries to alert the officer but is killed when Barry detonates his bomb remotely. The remaining three panic and run away, and the police search for them.

Omar has a change of heart, feeling guilt about manipulating the easily led Waj into dying for a cause he does not understand and attempts to prevent the attack. Two police snipers receive Omar's description, and one of them shoots at him as he tries to blend in with the runners but mistakenly kills a bystander in a Wookiee costume instead. Waj is cornered by police in a kebab shop and takes the staff hostage. Omar contacts Waj from his mobile phone and convinces him to let all but one of the hostages go. Barry finds Omar during the phone call, snatches the phone, and swallows the SIM card. However, as Barry begins to choke, a well-meaning passer-by attempts to perform the Heimlich manoeuvre, forcing Omar to flee before Barry's bombs are inadvertently detonated.

Omar hurries to a nearby mobile phone store to buy a new SIM card to contact Waj but leaves empty-handed due to the frustratingly slow employees and convoluted signup process. He spots a colleague (Craig Parkinson) and borrows his phone. He attempts to talk Waj down, but his call is interrupted when the police charge in and kill the remaining hostage, whom they mistake for Waj. Confused, Waj detonates his bomb, killing everyone in the kebab shop.

Distraught, Omar walks into a nearby Boots pharmacy and detonates his bomb. In an epilogue, it is revealed that the police later arrested Omar's innocent brother as a terrorist; that they deflect responsibility for shooting the hostage and bystander; and that Omar unknowingly killed Osama Bin Laden when misfiring his rocket in Pakistan.

Cast
 Riz Ahmed as Omar, a security guard with a slight temper who is the leader and the most rational of the terrorist cell
 Kayvan Novak as Waj, Omar's dim-witted and anxious cousin; although dim-witted, he has enough sense to consult Omar or Barry before making decisions
 Nigel Lindsay as Barry / Azzam Al-Britani, a rash convert with an explosive temper and the founder of the "Islamic State of Tinsley"
 Adeel Akhtar as Faisal, a dim-witted and naive member who always trusts Barry. He has a father who may have dementia as he sees "creatures" that are not there. 
 Arsher Ali as Hassan Malik, a rapper who joins the cell after Barry witnesses him pretending to blow himself up in protest at a conference
 Craig Parkinson as Matt, a security guard and Omar's coworker
 Preeya Kalidas as Sofia, Omar's wife and a nurse in a local hospital
 Julia Davis as Alice
 Benedict Cumberbatch as Ed, a Special Branch Negotiator
 Alex Macqueen as Malcolm Storge MP, a member of the Counter Terrorism Strategy Unit
 Kevin Eldon as Sniper
 Darren Boyd as Sniper
 Mohammad Aqil as Mahmood, Omar's young son
 Wazim Takir as Ahmed, Omar's devoutly conservative but pacifist brother
 William El-Gardi as Khalid

Production
Morris spent three years researching the project, speaking to terrorism experts, police, the secret service, and imams, as well as ordinary Muslims, and writing the script in 2007. In a separate interview, he asserts that the research predated the 7 July 2005 London bombings:

Chris Morris explained that Jesse Armstrong and Sam Bain were brought into the project as "experts in the school of male psychology, plus they have technical expertise and experience of comedy dialogue." Armstrong and Bain provided the first script, which Morris subsequently rewrote and edited.

Riz Ahmed initially declined but later signed on as he felt the film “challenged stereotypes”. He received Morris’ attention after writing a song called “Post 9/11 Blues” which he wrote about being detained at Luton Airport after the screening of the docudrama Road to Guantanamo in Berlin.

Morris suggested in a mass email, titled "Funding Mentalism", that fans could contribute between £25 and £100 each to the production costs of the film and would appear as extras in return. Funding was secured in October 2008 from Film 4 Productions and Warp Films, with Derrin Schlesinger & Mark Herbert producing. Filming began in Sheffield in May 2009.

Morris has described the film as a farce, which exposes the "Dad's Army side to terrorism". During the making of the film, the director sent the script to former Guantánamo Bay detainee Moazzam Begg. Begg has said that he found nothing in the script that would be offensive to British Muslims. Riz Ahmed also contacted Begg, to ask whether the subject matter was "too raw". When the film was completed, Begg was given a special screening and said that he enjoyed it.

The film's music supervisor was Phil Canning. The song "Avril 14th" by electronic musician Aphex Twin plays during the film's ending credits.

Release
The film premiered at the Sundance Film Festival in January 2010 and was short-listed for the festival's World Cinema Narrative prize. Introducing the film's premiere, Morris said: "I feel in a weird way that this is a good-hearted film. It's not a hate film, so I would hope that aspect would come through."

The UK première took place at the National Media Museum as part of Bradford International Film Festival on 25 March 2010, and was followed by a nationwide release on 7 May.
The UK premiere at the National Media Museum in Bradford was followed by a question and answer session with Chris Morris, Jesse Armstrong, Sam Bain, three of the principal actors, and two of the producers. Morris stated that he does not find the film at all controversial and that attempting to cause controversy is "one of the most boring things you can do". Morris also gave a talk introducing the film at a summer 2010 screening at Latitude Festival in Suffolk.

Despite its acclaim at the Sundance Film Festival, Four Lions failed to find a distributor in the U.S. for nine months, until the newly formed Drafthouse Films picked it up. The film had a limited release in the US on 5 November 2010.

Four Lions was released in the UK on DVD and Blu-ray on 30 August 2010, and in the U.S. on 8 March 2011.

Reception

Critical response

Four Lions received positive reviews from critics. Rotten Tomatoes gives the film a "Certified Fresh" score of 83%, based on 139 reviews, with an average rating of 7.3/10. The site's consensus reads, "Its premise suggests brazenly tasteless humor, but Four Lions is actually a smart, pitch-black comedy that carries the unmistakable ring of truth." Metacritic gives the film a score of 68 out of 100, based on 28 critics, indicating "generally favorable reviews".

The Daily Telegraph wrote that "[Chris Morris's] evocations of the claustrophobic mundanity of the Muslims' lives, their querulous banter, their flimsily pick 'n' mix approach to the Koran all feel painfully, brilliantly real."
The Daily Express rated Four Lions 4 out of 5 and praised the performances in particular, calling the film "brilliantly cast with all the actors displaying sharp comic timing and both [Riz] Ahmed and [Kayvan] Novak also bringing out the touching humanity of their characters."

Upon its screening at Sundance, the Los Angeles Times and The Hollywood Reporter gave the film extremely positive reviews, the latter describing the film as "a brilliant takedown of the imbecility of fanaticism" drawing comparisons with This Is Spinal Tap and The Three Stooges.

Amongst the reviewers that gave the film negative and mixed reviews were Nigel Andrews of the Financial Times, who called the film a "spectacular miss" and The Guardians Jeremy Kay, who wrote "as a satire on terror, Four Lions seems to be a missed opportunity". Andrew Pulver, also writing for The Guardian, gave the film a more favourable review, stating that "Chris Morris is still the most incendiary figure working in the British entertainment industry."

Box office
Despite an initial release on just 115 screens across the UK, the film was successful at the box office on its opening weekend, generating the highest site average of all the new releases (£5,292) and making a total of £609,000. According to the Official Top 10 UK Film Chart (7–9 May 2010), Four Lions was placed at sixth, behind Iron Man 2, Furry Vengeance, A Nightmare on Elm Street, Hot Tub Time Machine and The Back-up Plan. Due to its popularity, Optimum Releasing increased the number of screens showing the film to 200.

As of 8 August 2010, Four Lions grossed £2,932,366 at the UK box office. As of 13 March 2011, Four Lions worldwide gross was US$4,353,954.

Accolades

Time magazine rated the film as among Top 10 movies of 2010.

The lead actors, Kayvan Novak and Nigel Lindsay, were both nominated for Best Comedy Performance in Film at the British Comedy Awards 2010. Kayvan Novak went on to win the award, thanking all his "brothers"; referring to his fellow actors in Four Lions.

At the BAFTAs 2011, Chris Morris won the award for Outstanding Debut by a British Writer, Director or Producer. He beat competition from The Arbor, Exit Through the Gift Shop, Monsters and Skeletons.

See also
 List of films featuring drones

References

External links

 Official U.S. website
 
 
 Chris Morris's Four Lions: exclusive clip from the 'jihadist comedy' (guardian.co.uk)
 Podcast interview with Chris Morris (daily.greencine.com)
 
 

2010 films
2010 black comedy films
2010 comedy-drama films
2010s satirical films
British black comedy films
British comedy-drama films
British satirical films
Films about jihadism
Films set in Pakistan
Films set in Sheffield
Films about terrorism
Films set in Yorkshire
Films about terrorism in Europe
Films set in London
Film4 Productions films
2010 directorial debut films
Films shot in Sheffield
2010s English-language films
2010s British films